In Athabaskan mythology, Asintmah is an earth and nature goddess; the first woman on Earth.

Asintmah Corona 
In 2006, the International Astronomical Union's Working Group for Planetary System Nomenclature (IAU/WGPSN) officially adopted the name Asintmah for a corona on the planet Venus.

Asintmah Corona is located at latitude 25.9° North, longitude 208.0° West.

External links 
IAU/WGPSN Planetary Feature Nomenclature Database, USGS Branch of Astrogeology, Flagstaff, Arizona.

Goddesses of the indigenous peoples of North America
Earth goddesses
Nature goddesses